Eric Larue is an upcoming American drama film that marks the directorial debut of Michael Shannon. It is an adaptation by Brett Neveu of his own play of the same name from 2002.

Synopsis 
Janice, the mother of a high school murderer prepares to visit her son in prison, and prepares to meet a collection of bereaved local parents.

Cast 

 Judy Greer as Janice
 Paul Sparks
 Alison Pill
 Tracy Letts
 Annie Parisse
 Kate Arrington
 Alexander Skarsgård

Production 
The play Eric Larue by Brett Neveu debuted in 2002 in Chicago at the A Red Orchid Theatre, whose founding members include Michael Shannon. Neveu wrote the play in response to the 1999 Columbine High School massacre. Shannon was directing a different Neveu play when the a mass shooting occurred at the Marjory Stoneman Douglas High School in Parkland, Florida in February 2018, and a decision was made for Neveu to adapt his play Eric Larue for the screen. Shannon was announced as the director in July 2022. Shannon was quoted as saying "Eric Larue plays at the macro and a micro level simultaneously. When I read the screenplay, I immediately knew I had to direct it. I saw it. I heard it. I could feel it. And I wanted to make sure that it received just the right touch in all its aspects, because at the end of the day, it is an extraordinarily delicate thing." Executive production by Jeff Nichols and production by Sarah Green from Brace Cove Productions marks the seventh time they have worked together.

Production is also completed by Karl Hartman from Big Indie Pictures and Jina Panebianco from CaliWood Pictures, with executive producers also on board being R. Wesley Sierk III, Byron Wetzel, Meghan Schumacher, Joh D. Straley and Declan Baldwin. In July 2022, Judy Greer, Paul Sparks, Alison Pill, Tracy Letts, Annie Parisse, Kate Arrington and Alexander Skarsgård were announced as the cast. Filming was scheduled for August 8, 2022 to September 5, 2022 in Little Rock, Arkansas. However, citing an Arkansas state law which banned nearly all abortions in the state, including cases of rape and incest, it was announced that the production had withdrawn from the state and would instead be filming in and around Wilmington, North Carolina. Filming locations in Wilmington in August 2022 were thought to include Elderhaus, St. Andrews-Covenant Presbyterian Church and New River Pottery, amongst others. Filming was wrapped before the middle of September 2022.

References

External links 

Upcoming films
American independent films
Films about dysfunctional families
Films about mass murder
Films about school violence
Films about mother–son relationships
2020s English-language films
2020s American films
Films shot in North Carolina
Upcoming directorial debut films